Aichi Prefecture currently sends 36 elected members to the Diet of Japan, 29 to the House of Representatives and 7 to the House of Councillors.

House of Representatives 
The current House of Representatives Aichi delegation consists of 14 members of the LDP, 6 DPFP, 5 CDP, 1 Komeito, 1 JCP, 1 NIK and 1 independent.

District seats

PR seats 
Aichi Prefecture is part of the Tokai proportional representation block. In the current Diet, there are 14 Representatives from Aichi elected through the Tokai PR block.

House of Councillors 
The current House of Councillors Tokyo delegation consists of 2 members of the DPFP, 2 LDP, 1 CDP, 1 Komeito and 1 independent. The members are elected from the Aichi at-large district. The Aichi Councillors delegation will grow to eight after the 2019 election.

References 

Aichi Prefecture
Parliamentary districts of the Diet of Japan by prefecture
Districts of the House of Representatives (Japan)
Districts of the House of Councillors (Japan)